Frangula caroliniana, commonly called the  Carolina buckthorn, is a deciduous upright shrub or small tree native to the southeastern, south-central, and mid-western parts of the United States, from Texas east to Florida and north as far as Maryland, Ohio, Missouri, and Oklahoma. There is also an isolated population in the State of Nuevo León in northeastern Mexico. It is found in a wide variety of habitats, including barrens, forests, and limestone bluffs.

Description
The most striking characteristic of this plant are its shiny, dark green leaves. The flowers are very small and inconspicuous, pale yellow-green, bell-shaped, appearing in leaf axils in late spring after the leaves. The fruit is a small (1/3 inch or 8.3 mm) round drupe; at first red, but later turning black with juicy flesh. It ripens in late summer.

Despite its common name, the Carolina buckthorn is completely thornless.

Ecology and uses
Wildlife such as songbirds eat the fruits, which are reported to have medicinal uses.

References

External links
photo of herbarium specimen at Missouri Botanical Garden, collected in Missouri in 1995

caroliniana
Flora of the Southeastern United States
Flora of the United States
Flora of the Appalachian Mountains
Plants described in 1788